Players name marked in bold went on to earn full international caps.

Eligibility of players
 Each Participating Member Association shall ensure the following when selecting its representative team for the World Cup:
 all players shall be citizens of its country and subject to its jurisdiction;
 all players shall be eligible for selection in accordance with the FIFA Statutes and relevant FIFA regulations.
 In addition to the above provision, each Participating Member Association shall ensure that all players of its representative team were born on or after 1 January 1989.
 In addition to the above provisions, players who have already taken part in a preliminary or final competition of the FIFA U-20 World Cup and/or have taken part in a preliminary or final competition of an Olympic Football Tournament may compete in this competition provided they still fulfill the above age requirement.
 Protests regarding the eligibility of players shall be decided by the FIFA Disciplinary Committee in accordance with the FIFA Disciplinary Code.
 The Participating Member Associations are responsible for fielding only eligible players. Failure to do so will lead to the consequences stipulated in the FIFA Disciplinary Code.

Group A

Head coach:  Miroslav Soukup

Head coach: Francesco Rocca

Head coach:  Adrián Coria

Head coach:  Zoran Vraneš

Group B

Head coach: Samson Siasia

Head coach: César Farías

Head coach: Luis Milla

Head coach:  Lionel Charbonnier

Group C

Head coach: Alain Wabo

Head coach: Hong Myung-bo

Head coach: Horst Hrubesch

Head coach:  Thomas Rongen

Group D

Head coach:  Brian Eastick

Head coach:  Sellas Tetteh

Head coach:  Diego Aguirre

Head coach:  Akhmadjon Ubaydullaev

Group E

Head coach:  Jan Versleijen

Head coach:  Rogério Lourenço

Head coach:  Rónald González

Head coach:  Jakub Dovalil

Group F

Head coach:  Mahdi Ali

Head coach:  Emilio Umanzor

Head coach:  Sándor Egervári

Head coach:  Serame Letsoaka

References

Squads
FIFA U-20 World Cup squads